In the Circassian language, pronouns belong to the following groups: personal, demonstrative, possessive, interrogative, adherent and indefinite.

Personal pronouns
In Adyghe, personal pronouns are only expressed in first person, second person and reflexive second-person in singular and plural forms.

{|
|-
| сэ || о || усэплъэы
|-
| ||  || 
|-
| I || you || I am looking at you
|-
|colspan=3|"I am looking at you."
|}

{|
|-
| мы || ӏофыр || сэркӏэ || къины
|-
| ||  || ||  
|-
| this || work (abs.) || for me || hard
|-
|colspan=3|"this work is hard for me."
|}

{|
|-
| ежь || сэ || къысиӏуагъ
|-
| ||  ||  
|-
| him/her || I || (s)he told me
|-
|colspan=3|"he told me himself."
|}

Demonstrative pronouns
Demonstrative pronouns are мы "this", мо "that", а "that". There is a contradistinction between 'мы' and 'мо' on how far the referred object is. The pronoun 'а' is neutral on this matter. Third person pronouns are expressed as demonstrative pronouns.

{|
|-
| мор || о || уимашинэ
|-
| ||  || 
|-
| this (abs.) || you || your car
|-
|colspan=3|"That is your car."
|}

{|
|-
| ащ || къысиӏуагъэр || мыщ || есӏотэжьыгъ
|-
| ||  || ||  
|-
| that (erg.) || the thing (s)he told me || this (erg.) || I told him back
|-
|colspan=4|"I told this person the things that person told me."
|}

{|
|-
| ахэмкӏэ || мы || джанэу || мощ || щыгъэр || дахэ
|-
| ||  || ||    ||    ||  
|-
| for them (ins.) || this || shirt (adv.) || that (erg.) || the thing (s)he is wearing || beautiful
|-
|colspan=6|"According to them, the shirt this person is wearing is beautiful."
|}

The demonstrative pronouns джэ "that", дымы "this over here" and дымо "that over there" also exist in Circassian. There is a contradistinction between 'дымы' and 'дымо' on how far the referred object is. The pronoun 'джэ' is also neutral on this matter.

{|
|-
| дымощ || ицуакъэ || ишъо || олъэгъуа?
|-
| ||  ||  || 
|-
| that over there (erg.) || his shoe || its color || do you see it?
|-
|colspan=4|"Do you see the color of that person's shoe over there?"
|}

{|
|-
| джэхэмэ || садэгущыӏагъ
|-
| ||  
|-
| those (erg.) || I spoke to them
|-
|colspan=2|"I spoke to them."
|}

{|
|-
| дымор || кӏалэу || къысэуагъэр
|-
| ||  || 
|-
| that over there (abs.) || boy (adv.) || the one that hit me
|-
|colspan=3|"That is the boy that hit me over there."
|}

Interrogative pronoun
The interrogative pronoun is тэ "which".

Auxiliary interrogative words:

 хэт (хэта) "who".
 сыд (шъыд) "what/which".
 сыда (шъыда) "why".
 тыдэ "where".
 тхьэпш "how much".
 сыд фэдиз "how much".
 тэщтэу (сыдэущтэу) "how".
 тары "which".
 сыдигъу (шъыдгъо) "when".
 сыдкӏэ (шъыдкӏэ) "with what".
 сыд фэд? "what kind of?".

{|
|-
|хэт || къэкӏуагъэ?
|-
| ||
|-
|who || the person that came
|-
|colspan=2|"Who came?"
|}

{|
|-
|сыд || кӏалэм || ыцӏэ?
|-
| ||  || 
|-
|what || the boy (erg.) || his name
|-
|colspan=3|"What is the boy's name?"
|}

{|
|-
|непэ || тыдэ || ущыӏэщт?
|-
| ||  || 
|-
|today || where || you will be there
|-
|colspan=3|"Today where will you be?"
|}

Possessive pronouns

{|
|-
| мы || джэгуалъэхэр || сэсиех
|-
| ||  || 
|-
| this || toys (abs.) || they are mine
|-
|colspan=3|"these toys are mine."
|}

{|
|-
| дымо || унэ || плъэгъурэ || сэсый
|-
| ||  ||  || 
|-
| that over there || house || what one you're seeing || mine
|-
|colspan=4|"That house you are seeing is mine."
|}

{|
|-
| мыр || оуя || ежья?
|-
| ||  || 
|-
| this (abs.) || is it yours? || is it his?
|-
|colspan=3|"Is this yours or his?"
|}

The nouns in Adyghe are different by their accessory signs, which are broken down into the natural attribute and the property attribute. The natural attribute is for body parts and kin relationships (e.g. 'son', 'sister').  All other words belong to the property attribute.

 Natural attributes are expressed with the following prefixes:

{|
|-
| ышынахьыкӏэ || ицӏэ || Аслъан
|-
| ||  || 
|-
| his younger brother || his name || Aslan
|-
|colspan=3|"His younger brother's name is Aslan."
|}

{|
|-
| сэ || слъакъо || мэузы
|-
| ||  || 
|-
| I || my leg || it is hurting
|-
|colspan=3|"my leg hurts."
|}

 Property attributes are expressed by a different set of prefixes:

{|
|-
| сэ || сицӏэ || Аслъан
|-
| ||  || 
|-
| I || my name || Aslan
|-
|colspan=3|"My name is Aslan."
|}

{|
|-
| сэ || сиунэ || ишъо || фыжьы
|-
| ||  ||  || 
|-
| I || my house || its color || white
|-
|colspan=3|"The color of my house is white."
|}

{|
|-
| яджанэхэр || нахь || дахэх || уиджанэхэмэ
|-
| ||  ||  || 
|-
| their clothes (abs.) || more || beautiful (plural) || your clothes (erg.)
|-
|colspan=4|"Their clothes are more beautiful than yours."
|}

Indefinite pronoun
In Adyghe whole one - зыгорэ. Serves for indication of all notions corresponding to English words "someone", "something", "someone", "something", "sometime", "somewhere", etc.

Changes either as noun – in number and in cases:

{|
|-
| зыгорэ || пчъэм || къытеуагъ 
|-
| ||  || 
|-
|someone (abs.) ||  door (erg.) || (s)he knocked it
|-
|colspan=3|"someone has knocked the door."
|}

{|
|-
|кӏалэ горэм|| бэнанэр || ешхы
|-
| ||  || 
|-
|some boy (erg.) || the banana (abs.) || he eats
|-
|colspan=3|"some boy is eating the banana"
|}

{|
|-
|пшъэшъэ || дахэ горэм || мыр || къысиӏуагъ
|-
| ||  ||  || 
|-
| girl || some pretty (erg.) || this || he/she told me
|-
|colspan=4|"some pretty girl told me this"
|}

Circassian adherent pronouns:

зыр, зым "one"
зыхэр, зыхэм "some"
зыгорэ, зыгорэм "someone, something"
тӏур, тӏум "both"
тэдрэзым "each one"
нэмыкӏыр "other"
ежь "self",
зэкӏэ "whole, all",
пстэури "everyone",
шъхьадж "every",
ышъхьэкӏэ "self personally",
хэти, хэтрэ "everyone", "each",
сыди, сыдрэ "everything", "each".
тыди, тыдэкӏи "everywhere",
зи, зыми "no one" (verb has to be negative)
зыгорэп "nothing" (verb has to be negative)
зыгори, зыгорэми "nobody, no one" (verb has to be negative)

Examples:

Хэти зышъхьамысыжьэу 1оф ыш1эн фае "Everyone must work hard";
Сыдрэ 1офри дэгъу, угу къыбде1эу бгъэцак1эмэ "Each job is good if it is made with soul".
Зыгори чэщдэсым къэкӏощтэп "Nobody will come to the party".
Пстэури экзамыным феджэх "Everyone is studying for the exam".
Ышъхьэкӏэ къыкӏонэу зэрэфамые къыӏуагъ "He said himself that he doesn't want to come".
Зыр къещхымэ унэм икӏыщтэп "One will not go out of the house if it is raining".
Зыхэр чэщым къыдэкӏыщтых, зыхэр къыдэкӏыщтыхэп "Some will go out in the night, some won't".

Indicatory pronouns

{|
|-
| сэры || къэшъугъотын фае
|-
| || 
|-
| it is me || the one you must find
|-
|colspan=2|"the one you must find is me."
|}

{|
|-
| ары || къысиIуагъэ
|-
| || 
|-
| that is || the thing he told me
|-
|colspan=2|"that is what he told me"
|}

{|
|-
| дыморы || кIалэу || сфэсIуагъэ
|-
| ||  ||  
|-
| that is over there || boy (adv.) || the thing i talked about
|-
|colspan=3|"here is the boy i talked about"
|}

References

Bibliography
 Аркадьев, П. М.; Ландер, Ю. А.; Летучий, А. Б.; Сумбатова, Н. Р.; Тестелец, Я. Г. Введение. Основные сведения об адыгейском языке в кн.: "Аспекты полисинтетизма: очерки по грамматике адыгейского языка" под ред.: П. М. Аркадьев, А. Б. Летучий, Н. Р. Сумбатова, Я. Г. Тестелец. Москва: РГГУ, 2009 (Arkadiev, P. M.; Lander, Yu. A.; Letuchiy, A. B.; Sumbatova, N. R.; Testelets, Ya. G.
 Introduction. Basic information about Adyghe language in "Aspects of polysyntheticity: studies on Adyghe grammar" edited by: P. M. Arkadiev, A. B. Letuchiy, N. R. Sumbatova, Ya. G. Testelets. Moscow, RGGU, 2009) (in Russian) 

Adyghe language
Pronouns by language